Cave Hill, St. Lucy is in the Parish of St. Lucy on the island-nation of Barbados.  Cave Hill, St. Lucy is a coastal area located on the north-eastern Atlantic Ocean side of the island.  The beaches of the Cave Hill, St Lucy area are much rockier and rougher than the west coast, this is due to the turbulence of the Atlantic Ocean's waves.

Saint Lucy, Barbados
Populated places in Barbados